In mathematics, Wolstenholme's theorem states that for a prime number , the congruence

holds, where the parentheses denote a binomial coefficient. For example, with p = 7, this says that 1716 is one more than a multiple of 343. The theorem was first proved by Joseph Wolstenholme in 1862. An equivalent formulation is the congruence

No known composite numbers satisfy Wolstenholme's theorem and it is conjectured that there are none (see below).  A prime that satisfies the congruence modulo p4 is called a Wolstenholme prime (see below).

As Wolstenholme himself established, his theorem can also be expressed as a pair of congruences for (generalized) harmonic numbers:

(Congruences with fractions make sense, provided that the denominators are coprime to the modulus.)
For example, with p=7, the first of these says that the numerator of 49/20 is a multiple of 49, while the second says the numerator of 5369/3600 is a multiple of 7.

Wolstenholme primes 

A prime p is called a Wolstenholme prime iff the following condition holds:

If p is a Wolstenholme prime, then Glaisher's theorem holds modulo p4.  The only known Wolstenholme primes so far are 16843 and 2124679 ; any other Wolstenholme prime must be greater than 109. This result is consistent with the heuristic argument that the residue modulo p4 is a pseudo-random multiple of p3.  This heuristic predicts that the number of Wolstenholme primes between K and N is roughly ln ln N − ln ln K.  The Wolstenholme condition has been checked up to 109, and the heuristic says that there should be roughly one Wolstenholme prime between 109 and 1024.  A similar heuristic predicts that there are no "doubly Wolstenholme" primes, for which the congruence would hold modulo p5.

A proof of the theorem 

There is more than one way to prove Wolstenholme's theorem.  Here is a proof that directly establishes Glaisher's version using both combinatorics and algebra.

For the moment let p be any prime, and let a and b be any non-negative integers.  Then a set A with ap elements can be divided into a rings of length p, and the rings can be rotated separately. Thus, the a-fold direct sum of the cyclic group of order p acts on the set A, and by extension it acts on the set of subsets of size bp.  Every orbit of this group action has pk elements, where k is the number of incomplete rings, i.e., if there are k rings that only partly intersect a subset B in the orbit.  There are  orbits of size 1 and there are no orbits of size p.  Thus we first obtain Babbage's theorem

Examining the orbits of size p2, we also obtain

Among other consequences, this equation tells us that the case a=2 and b=1 implies the general case of the second form of Wolstenholme's theorem.

Switching from combinatorics to algebra, both sides of this congruence are polynomials in a for each fixed value of b.  The congruence therefore holds when a is any integer, positive or negative, provided that b is a fixed positive integer.  In particular, if a=-1 and b=1, the congruence becomes

This congruence becomes an equation for  using the relation

When p is odd, the relation is

When p≠3, we can divide both sides by 3 to complete the argument.

A similar derivation modulo p4 establishes that

for all positive a and b if and only if it holds when a=2 and b=1, i.e., if and only if p is a Wolstenholme prime.

The converse as a conjecture 
It is conjectured that if

when k=3, then n is prime. The conjecture can be understood by considering k = 1 and 2 as well as 3. When k = 1, Babbage's theorem implies that it holds for n = p2 for p an odd prime, while Wolstenholme's theorem implies that it holds for n = p3 for p > 3, and it holds for n = p4 if p is a Wolstenholme prime. When k = 2, it holds for n = p2 if p is a Wolstenholme prime.

27173, 2001341, 16024189487, 80478114820849201, 20378551049298456998947681, ... 

The first three are not prime powers , the last two are 168434 and 21246794, 16843 and 2124679 are Wolstenholme primes . Thus the conjecture is considered likely because Wolstenholme's congruence seems over-constrained and artificial for composite numbers. Moreover, if the congruence does hold for any particular n other than a prime or prime power, and any particular k, it does not imply that

The number of Wolstenholme pseudoprimes up to  should be at least 7 if the sum of its reciprocals diverged, and since this is not satisfied, the counting function of these pseudoprimes is at most  for some efficiently computable constant ; we can take  as 499712.

Generalizations 

Leudesdorf has proved that for a positive integer n coprime to 6, the following congruence holds:

See also 
 Fermat's little theorem
 Wilson's theorem
 Wieferich prime
 Wilson prime
 Wall–Sun–Sun prime
 List of special classes of prime numbers
 Table of congruences

Notes

References
.
.
.
.
.
.
R. Mestrovic, Wolstenholme's theorem: Its Generalizations and Extensions in the last hundred and fifty years (1862—2012).
.

External links 
 The Prime Glossary: Wolstenholme prime
 Status of the search for Wolstenholme primes

Classes of prime numbers
Factorial and binomial topics
Articles containing proofs
Theorems about prime numbers